The Episcopal Palace is a building located in Piazza Mino of Fiesole, Italy. Built in the eleventh century, it serves as the residence of the Bishop of Fiesole.

History 

At the front of the Episcopal Palace is a double staircase constructed in the 19th century. The palace was built contemporaneously with the adjacent Fiesole Cathedral in 1028, under the episcopate of Bishop Jacopo Bavaro. Over time, the palace was modified and expanded.

In the fourteenth century, the palace was enlarged by Bishop Andrew Corsini, and subsequently by Bishops Francesco Maria Ginori and Cattani da Diacceto. The coat of arms of Bishop Filippo Neri Altoviti is prominently positioned above the entrance to the palace due to his expansion. The current façade dates to 1500.

Inside the palace is the bishop's private chapel, which contains frescoes in the Ghirlandaio school from the late 15th century, depicting Saint Romulus, Saint James, and God the Father.

Also inside is the Oratory of San Jacopo Maggiore, which was built by Bishop Cattani da Diacceto. In it is a piece by Lorenzo di Bicci depicting the Coronation of the Virgin. There are also paintings by Niccodemo Ferrucci and Antonio Marini.

To the right of the Episcopal Palace is a rectory that was built in 1032 to house the canons of the cathedral next door. In 1439, it was expanded, adding a courtyard surrounded by an arcade and a marble column in the center with a small, metal image of Maria Santissima, which was commissioned by Bishop Ranieri Mancini.

In the palace's garden are the remains of an Etruscan wall that continues into the garden of the adjacent Episcopal Seminary, which once supported the lower circle of the acropolis on which the San Francesco Monastery now resides.

See also 

 Fiesole Cathedral
 Episcopal Seminary of Fiesole
 Church of Santa Maria Primerana
 San Francesco Monastery (Fiesole)

References

External links 

 Diocese of Fiesole

Buildings and structures in Fiesole
Palaces in Tuscany
Buildings and structures completed in 1028
Episcopal palaces of the Catholic Church
1028 establishments in Europe